France participated in the Eurovision Song Contest 2021 with the song "" written by Barbara Pravi, Lili Poe and Igit. The song was performed by Barbara Pravi. The French broadcaster  in collaboration with the television channel  organised the national final  in order to select the French entry for the 2021 contest in Rotterdam, Netherlands. Twelve songs competed in the national final where the winner was selected over two rounds of voting. In the first round, eight entries were selected to advance to the second round: seven entries selected a public vote and one entry selected by a ten-member jury panel. In the second round, "" performed by Barbara Pravi was selected as the winner following the combination of votes from a ten-member jury panel and a public vote.

As a member of the "Big Five", France automatically qualified to compete in the final of the Eurovision Song Contest. Performing in position 20, France placed second out of the 26 participating countries with 499 points.

Background 

France first won the contest in 1958 with "" performed by André Claveau. In the 1960s, they won three times, with "" performed by Jacqueline Boyer in 1960, "" performed by Isabelle Aubret in 1962 and "" performed by Frida Boccara, who won in 1969 in a four-way tie with the Netherlands, Spain and the United Kingdom. France's fifth victory came in 1977, when Marie Myriam won with the song "". France have also finished second four times, with Paule Desjardins in 1957, Catherine Ferry in 1976, Joëlle Ursull in 1990 and Amina in 1991, who lost out to Sweden's Carola in a tie-break. In the 21st century, France has had less success, only making the top ten four times, with Natasha St-Pier finishing fourth in 2001, Sandrine François finishing fifth in 2002, Patricia Kaas finishing eighth in 2009 and Amir finishing sixth in 2016. In 2020, the nation was set to be represented by the song "Mon alliée (The Best in Me)" performed by Tom Leeb before the event's cancellation due to the COVID-19 pandemic.

The French national broadcaster, broadcasts the event within France and delegates the selection of the nation's entry to the television channel .  confirmed that France would participate in the 2021 Eurovision Song Contest on 22 June 2020. The French broadcaster had used both national finals and internal selection to choose the French entry in the past. The 2018 and 2019 French entries were selected via the national final . In 2020,  opted to internally select the French entry, however the broadcaster announced in June 2020 that the 2021 French entry would be selected via a new national final format.

Before Eurovision

Eurovision France, c'est vous qui décidez ! 
 ("Eurovision France, it's you who decide!") was the national final organised by France 2 to select France's entry for the Eurovision Song Contest 2021. The competition took place on 30 January 2021 at the France Télévisions studio in Paris, hosted by Stéphane Bern and Laurence Boccolini. The show was broadcast on France 2, TV5Monde and TV5 Québec Canada on a time delay as well as online via the broadcaster's official website france.tv. The national final was watched by 2.37 million viewers in France with a market share of 12.3%.

Format 
The format of the national final consisted of a live final on 30 January 2021 where the winner was selected over two rounds of voting. Twelve entries competed in the first round, from which seven were selected exclusively by public televoting to advance to the second round, the superfinal. A ten-member Francophone and international jury panel then selected a wildcard entry from the remaining five entries to proceed to the superfinal. In the superfinal, the winner was determined by the combination of public televoting (50%) and the ten-member jury panel (50%). The public and the juries each had a total of 420 points to award, with each jury member awarding 2, 4, 6, 8, 10 and 12 points to their top six entries. Viewers were able to vote via telephone and SMS voting which also accepted international votes, with the public vote awarding 10, 20, 30, 50, 60, 70, 80 and 100 points to their top eight songs.

The jury panel consisted of:

 Amir (jury president) – singer, songwriter, represented France in the 2016 Contest
 Chimène Badi – Singer
 Michèle Bernier – Comedian
  – Spanish singer and comedian
 Jean-Paul Gaultier – Fashion designer
 Élodie Gossuin – Television presenter
 Duncan Laurence – Dutch singer, winner of the Eurovision Song Contest 2019
 André Manoukian – Jazz singer and former judge on Nouvelle Star
 Marie Myriam – Singer, winner of the Eurovision Song Contest 1977
 Natasha St-Pier – Canadian singer, represented France in the 2001 contest

Competing entries 
 opened a submission period on 29 June 2020 in order for interested artists and songwriters to submit their proposals through an online submission form up until the deadline on 30 September 2020. Songs were required to contain a majority of French language or French regional language lyrics with a free language allowance for the remaining lyrics. At the closing of the deadline, the French broadcaster received 700 submissions. Auditions which featured 20 entries shortlisted from the received submissions took place at the Apollo Theatre in Paris and the twelve entries selected to compete in the national final were announced on 9 December 2020. Between 16 and 27 December 2020, the competing artists and their entries were presented to the public through television specials titled .

Final 
The final took place on 30 January 2021. Twelve entries competed and the winner was selected over two rounds of voting. In the first round, the top seven entries as determined exclusively by public televoting advanced to the second round, the superfinal. "" performed by LMK was awarded the wildcard by a Francophone and international ten-member jury panel from the remaining five entries to proceed to the superfinal. Immediately after the artists concluded their performances, a number was shown which denoted the amount of jury members who liked the song, however the results were symbolic and did not affect the voting. In the superfinal, the winner, "" performed by Barbara Pravi, was determined by the combination of public televoting and the ten-member jury.

In addition to performing their contest entry, the eight superfinalists performed the Swiss Eurovision Song Contest 1988 winning song "" by Celine Dion together with French Junior Eurovision Song Contest 2020 winner Valentina, who also performed her winning song "". Jury member Amir performed a medley of his songs from his three French language albums as the interval act of the show.

At Eurovision 
According to Eurovision rules, all nations with the exceptions of the host country and the "Big Five" (France, Germany, Italy, Spain and the United Kingdom) are required to qualify from one of two semi-finals in order to compete for the final; the top ten countries from each semi-final progress to the final. As a member of the "Big 5", France automatically qualified to compete in the final on 22 May 2021. In addition to their participation in the final, France was also required to broadcast and vote in one of the two semi-finals. In accordance with the allocation draw conducted on 28 January 2020 and carried over to 2021, France was assigned to broadcast and vote in the second semi-final on 20 May 2021.

The French spokesperson, who announced the top 12-point score awarded by the French jury during the final, was Carla Lazzari, who represented France in the Junior Eurovision Song Contest 2019.

Final 
Following the conclusion of the second semi-final, the shows' producers decided upon the running order of the final. The running order for the semi-finals and final was decided by the shows' producers rather than through another draw, so that similar songs were not placed next to each other. France was drawn in position 20, following the song from Ukraine and preceding the song from Azerbaijan.

For the live performance, Barbara Pravi performed alone dressed in a two-piece outfit in black and using the same staging and visuals from her national final performance.

France placed second in the final, scoring 499 points: 251 points from the televoting and 248 points from the juries. This was France's best result since .

Voting 
Voting during the three shows involved each country awarding two sets of points from 1-8, 10 and 12: one from their professional jury and the other from televoting. Each nation's jury consisted of five music industry professionals who are citizens of the country they represent, with a diversity in gender and age represented. The judges assess each entry based on the performances during the second Dress Rehearsal of each show, which takes place the night before each live show, against a set of criteria including: vocal capacity; the stage performance; the song's composition and originality; and the overall impression by the act. Jury members may only take part in panel once every three years, and are obliged to confirm that they are not connected to any of the participating acts in a way that would impact their ability to vote impartially. Jury members should also vote independently, with no discussion of their vote permitted with other jury members. The exact composition of the professional jury, and the results of each country's jury and televoting were released after the grand final; the individual results from each jury member were also released in an anonymised form.

Points awarded to France

Points awarded by France

Detailed voting results 
The following members comprised the French jury:
 Géraldine Allouche
 Adrien Kaiser
 Kahina Kimoune
 Gilbert Marcellus
 Loïc Parent

References

External links 
 
 

2021
Countries in the Eurovision Song Contest 2021
Eurovision
Eurovision